The V platform is a rear-wheel drive automobile platform that underpinned various General Motors (GM) vehicles from 1966 through to its final discontinuation in 2007. The V platform was developed in the 1960s by the German subsidiary of GM, Opel. However, it was not without significant revision over its lifetime. The platform's phase-out began when European production ended during 2003, while the Australian variants, produced by Holden continued until 2007, after their final replacement by Zeta-derived models. The first of these Zeta cars came in 2006, with the remaining changing over in 2007. V-cars are identified by the "V" fourth character in their Vehicle Identification Number. Although completely unrelated, the "V platform" designation was also used for a series of North American front-wheel drive personal luxury coupes (see: GM V platform (1987)).

Applications 

 Buick XP2000
 1995: Buick XP2000 (Concept Vehicle only)
 Daewoo Prince
 1991–1997: Daewoo Prince.
 Holden Commodore
 1978–1988: Holden Commodore, Holden Calais, (VB, VC, VH, VK, VL).
 1988–1997: Holden Commodore, Holden Berlina, Holden Calais, (VN/VG, VP, VR, VS).
 1997–2007: Holden Commodore, Holden Berlina, Holden Calais, Chevrolet Lumina, Chevrolet Omega (VT, VX, VY, VZ).
 Holden Monaro
 2001–2006: Holden Monaro, Chevrolet Lumina SS, Pontiac GTO, Vauxhall Monaro (V2, VZ).
 Holden Caprice
 1990–1999: Holden Statesman, Holden Caprice (VQ, VR, VS).
 1999–2006: Holden Statesman, Holden Caprice, Buick Royaum, Chevrolet Caprice, Daewoo Statesman (WH, WK, WL).
 Holden Ute
 2000–2007: Holden Ute, Chevrolet Lumina Ute (VU, VY, VZ).
 Opel Commodore
 1967–1971: Opel Commodore A, Chevrolet Commodore.
 1972–1977: Opel Commodore B, Ranger, Chevrolet Commodore, Chevrolet Iran.
 1977–1982: Opel Commodore C, Vauxhall Viceroy, Chevrolet Commodore, Daewoo Royale.
 Opel Monza
 1978–1986: Opel Monza A, Vauxhall Royale Coupe.
 Opel Omega
 1986–1994: Opel Omega A, Vauxhall Carlton Mark II, Chevrolet Omega A (1992–1999), Lotus Carlton, Lotus Omega.
 1994–2003: Opel Omega B, Vauxhall Omega B, Cadillac Catera.
 Opel Rekord
 1966–1971: Opel Rekord C, Ranger, Chevrolet Comodoro, Chevrolet Opala.
 1972–1977: Opel Rekord D, Ranger.
 1977–1986: Opel Rekord E, Vauxhall Carlton Mark I.
 Opel Senator
 1978–1987: Opel Senator A, Chevrolet Senator, Vauxhall Royale.
 1987–1994: Opel Senator B, Vauxhall Senator.

V 1